Authorised Neutral Athletes has participated at the World Athletics Championships from the edition of 2017 World Athletics Championships, winning eight podiums, including three world titles. 

The IAAF has established that the Authorised Neutral Athletes team will not have to appear in the medal table in any competition.

Medalists

Medal count

References

External links

Authorised Neutral Athlete - Countries - IAAF World Championships London 2017

 
Nations at the World Athletics Championships